Walzenhausen is a municipality in the canton of Appenzell Ausserrhoden in Switzerland.

History
The farm Walzenhausen was mentioned first in 1320. The church was built in 1638 in as little as nine months. This was the establishment of Walzenhausen as a municipality.

In the past textiles played an important role, but today tourism has taken this role. This is facilitated by good public transport links.

Geography

Of this area, 52.4% is used for agricultural purposes, while 34.4% is forested. The rest of the land, (13.1%) is settled.

Walzenhausen is the easternmost village in the canton Appenzell Ausserrhoden.

Grimmenstein monastery is a small exclave of the canton of Appenzell Innerrhoden within the municipality. During the Protestant Reformation Walzenhausen adopted the new faith, while the monastery remained catholic. After centuries of debate and conflict over the monastery lands, in 1870 the federal government declared that land within the monastery walls was part of Innerrhoden.

Transport
The line operates one or two return journeys per hour, depending on the time of day, which connect at Rheineck with main line services to the city of St. Gallen and other local towns. Local buses link Walzenhausen to Heiden and St. Margrethen.

Demographics
Walzenhausen has a population of 2,071, of which about 16.2% are foreign nationals.  Over the last 10 years the population has decreased at a rate of -4.1%.  Most of the population speaks German  (92.3%), with Serbo-Croatian being second most common ( 1.7%) and Italian being third ( 1.4%).

, the gender distribution of the population was 50.9% male and 49.1% female.  The age distribution, in Walzenhausen is; 176 people or 8.1% of the population are between 0–6 years old.  278 people or 12.7% are 6-15, and 98 people or 4.5% are 16–19.  Of the adult population, 96 people or 4.4% of the population are between 20 and 24 years old.  646 people or 29.6% are 25–44, and 530 people or 24.3% are 45–64.  The senior population distribution is 250 people or 11.5% of the population are between 65 and 79 years old, and  107 people or 4.9% are over 80.

In the 2007 federal election the FDP received 68.4% of the vote.

In Walzenhausen about 68.5% of the population (between age 25-64) have completed either non-mandatory upper secondary education or additional higher education (either university or a Fachhochschule).

Walzenhausen has an unemployment rate of 1.67%.  , there were 53 people employed in the primary economic sector and about 27 businesses involved in this sector.  323 people are employed in the secondary sector and there are 34 businesses in this sector.  732 people are employed in the tertiary sector, with 72 businesses in this sector.

The historical population is given in the following table:

Notable residents
Carl Lutz (1895–1975), Swiss vice-consul to Hungary during WWII, credited with saving over 62,000 Jews

References

External links
 Official Page (German)

Municipalities of Appenzell Ausserrhoden